Numbers & Mumbles (2004) is the second full-length release by Say Hi. It includes a cover of The Beatles' song "I'm So Tired". According to Elbogen, "Let's Talk About Spaceships" is the most popular song among fans and is a great crowd pleaser.

Track listing
 "Pop Music of the Future" – 3:06
 "A Hit in Sweden" – 3:07
 "Super" – 3:39
 "Hooplas Involving Circus Tricks" – 4:07
 "Let's Talk About Spaceships" – 3:03
 "A Kiss to Make It Better" – 2:48
 "But She Beat My High Score" – 2:11
 "Your Brain vs. My Tractorbeam" – 3:07
 "I'm So Tired" – 2:11
 "The Key of C" – 4:24

References

  2. Review by Embo Blake, Hybrid Magazine, accessed 2012-06-12.
  3. Review by Steve English, Splendid Magazine, 2004-01-28, accessed 2012-06-12.

2004 albums
Say Hi albums